Catherine Furnace is a historic iron furnace located in the George Washington National Forest near Newport, Page County, Virginia. It was built in 1836, and is a pyramidal shaped furnace measuring 32 feet high. It was instrumental in producing high quality pig iron that was used in the Mexican War and American Civil War.  The furnace was abandoned in 1885.

It was listed on the National Register of Historic Places in 1974.

References

Industrial buildings and structures on the National Register of Historic Places in Virginia
Industrial buildings completed in 1836
Buildings and structures in Page County, Virginia
National Register of Historic Places in Page County, Virginia
Industrial furnaces
Ironworks in Virginia